High Seat can refer to one of two hills in England:

High Seat, Lake District, a 608m hill in the central part of the Lake District
High Seat, Yorkshire Dales, a 709m hill in the Yorkshire Dales.